William Eric Carlsson (January 1892 – 14 July 1916) was a South African first-class cricket, rugby union player and a soldier in the South African Army.

Carlsson was born at Hoetjies Bay in January 1892. He was educated at the He was educated at both the Diocesan College and St George's Grammar School. Carlsson played first-class cricket for Western Province in the 1910–11 Currie Cup, making four appearances against Eastern Province, Border, Natal, and Griqualand West. He scored 44 runs in his four matches, with a highest score of 24.

He was a member of the Western Province team that won the Currie Cup in 1914, by winning all nine of their matches in the competition.

Carlsson served in the South African Army during the First World War as a private in the 1st Infantry Brigade, which travelled to Europe as part of the South African Overseas Expeditionary Force. He saw action on the Western Front, where he fought in the Battle of the Somme in July 1916. He was killed in action at Delville Wood on 14 July. He is commemorated at the Thiepval Memorial.

References

External links

1892 births
1916 deaths
Alumni of Diocesan College, Cape Town
South African cricketers
Western Province cricketers
South African Army personnel
South African military personnel of World War I
South African military personnel killed in World War I
Western Province (rugby union) players